Earl M. Brown Jr. (October 23, 1915 – September 23, 2003) was an American football and basketball player and coach.  He served as the head football coach at Dartmouth College (1943–1944), the United States Merchant Marine Academy (1945), Canisius College (1946–1947), and Auburn University (1948–1950), compiling a career college football record of 27–36–6.  Brown was also the head basketball coach at Harvard University (1941–1943), Dartmouth (1943–1944), the United States Merchant Marine Academy (1945–1946), and Canisius (1946–1948), tallying a career college basketball mark of 72–70.  He led Dartmouth to the finals of the 1944 NCAA Division I men's basketball tournament.

Brown is notorious for his stretch at as football coach at Auburn, where he went 3–22–4, including a record of 0–10 in his final season, when the Tigers were outscored 285–31. Brown's first season as the head coach at Auburn was also the first season Auburn and the Alabama met on the gridiron since 1907; Auburn lost, 55–0. The next season, though, he coached Auburn to one of the greatest upsets in its history, when the Tigers, who entered the game with a record of 1–4–3, stunned heavily favored Alabama, who entered the game with a 6–2–1 record, 14–13.

Brown played football and basketball at the University of Notre Dame. He was an assistant coach at Harvard, Brown, and the head coach at Dartmouth from 1943 to 1944, where he compiled a record of 8–6–1.  In 1945, he posted a 5–3 record in his only season as the head coach at the United States Merchant Marine Academy.  After leaving Auburn, Brown later served as an assistant coach for the Detroit Lions.

Brown died on September 23, 2003 in Leesburg, Florida.

Head coaching record

Football

Basketball

See also
 List of NCAA Division I Men's Final Four appearances by coach

References

External links
 

1915 births
2003 deaths
American football ends
American men's basketball players
Auburn Tigers football coaches
Basketball coaches from Michigan
Basketball players from Michigan
Brown Bears football coaches
Canisius Golden Griffins football coaches
Canisius Golden Griffins men's basketball coaches
Dartmouth Big Green football coaches
Dartmouth Big Green men's basketball coaches
Detroit Lions coaches
Harvard Crimson football coaches
Harvard Crimson men's basketball coaches
Merchant Marine Mariners football coaches
Merchant Marine Mariners men's basketball coaches
Notre Dame Fighting Irish football players
Notre Dame Fighting Irish men's basketball players
People from Benton Harbor, Michigan
Players of American football from Michigan